Doria Loyce Ragland (born September 2, 1956) is an American social worker, and former makeup artist and yoga instructor. She is the mother of Meghan, Duchess of Sussex.

Early life 
Doria Ragland was born in Cleveland, Ohio, to nurse Jeanette Arnold (1929–2000) and her second husband Alvin Azell Ragland (1929–2011), an antiques dealer who sold items at flea markets. Ragland's maternal grandparents, James and Nettie Arnold, respectively worked as a bellhop and an elevator operator at the Hotel St. Regis on Euclid Avenue in Cleveland. Her parents moved to Los Angeles when Ragland was a baby and later divorced. In 1983, her father married kindergarten teacher Ava Burrow, who is near to Ragland's age; the two remained close after that marriage also ended in divorce. Ragland has two older maternal half-siblings, Joseph (known as "JJ"; 1949–2021) and Saundra Johnson (born 1952), and a younger paternal half-brother, Alvin Joffrey Ragland. According to inferred conclusions and information passed down (much of it verbally) from earlier generations, the Ragland family descend from Richard Ragland, born into slavery in Jonesboro, Georgia, in 1830; he lived long enough to experience the abolition of slavery in 1865. His surname came from slave-owner William Ragland, a Methodist planter and land speculator who had emigrated during the eighteenth century from Cornwall, England to North America.

Career and education
After leaving Fairfax High School, Ragland worked as a temp assistant makeup artist and met her future husband, Thomas Markle, while employed on the set of the television show General Hospital. Later on, their daughter Meghan stayed with Thomas Markle as Ragland pursued a career. She later worked as a travel agent and owned a small business before filing for bankruptcy in the mid-2000s. Ragland completed a Bachelor of Arts in psychology. In 2011, she earned a Master of Social Work from the University of Southern California. After passing California's licensing exam in 2015, she was a social worker for three years at the Didi Hirsch Mental Health Services clinic in Culver City. Ragland has also worked as a yoga instructor. In 2020, it was reported that she would teach a jewelry making course at Santa Monica College. In the same year, Ragland became CEO, CFO and secretary of a care home firm in Beverly Hills, called Loving Kindness Senior Care Management.

Personal life 
Ragland married lighting director Thomas Markle Sr. on December 23, 1979, at Hollywood's Paramahansa Yogananda Self-Realization Fellowship Temple in a ceremony performed by Brother Bhaktananda. Their daughter, Meghan, was born in 1981. The couple separated when their daughter was two years old. They divorced in 1987. Both parents contributed to raising Meghan until, at the age of 9, she began living with Thomas Markle full-time while Ragland pursued a career.

Ragland resides in View Park–Windsor Hills, California, in a house inherited from her father in 2011. She has accompanied Meghan to public events and attended her 2018 wedding to Prince Harry in Berkshire. Ragland became a grandmother on May 6, 2019. She flew to the United Kingdom to see her grandson, Archie Mountbatten-Windsor, and his parents. In July, she attended Mountbatten-Windsor's christening at the private chapel at Windsor Castle. Her granddaughter, Lilibet Mountbatten-Windsor, was born on June 4, 2021 in Santa Barbara, California.

See also

 "(Almost) Straight Outta Compton", a 2016 tabloid article headline about Meghan Markle and her mother's background

Notes

References

External links

 
 

1956 births
20th-century African-American people
20th-century African-American women
21st-century African-American people
21st-century African-American women
American social workers
American yoga teachers
Living people
Markle family
People from Cleveland
People from Los Angeles
People from View Park–Windsor Hills, California
USC Suzanne Dworak-Peck School of Social Work alumni
20th-century American people